Great Holland is a village and former civil parish, now in the parish of Frinton and Walton, in the Tendring district, in the county of Essex, England. It is to the north-east of Holland-on-Sea, and west of Frinton-on-Sea. The village is served by a bus service to Clacton-on-Sea to the south and Kirby Cross, to the north. The village is served by two churches, a Methodist church and the parish church, 'All Saints'. There is an annual church fete held in the grounds of the Old Rectory funds of which go to All Saints. In 2020 the built-up area subdivision had an estimated population of 797. In 1931 the parish had a population of 623.

Great Holland has a community owned pub called The Ship Inn.

History 
On 1 April 1934 the parish was abolished to form "Frinton and Walton".

Notable residents
Lilian Hicks, suffragette, lived here
Amy Bull, a leader of the suffragettes, was born at Great Holland Hall in 1877.

References

External links

Villages in Essex
Former civil parishes in Essex
Tendring